Metal Hits is a compilation album by the heavy metal band Dio and was released in 2005 by Rhino Flashback Records. Multi-instrumentalist and heavy-metal mainstay Ronnie James Dio built up a hefty back catalog over the decades, with a career that spans vocalizing for Rainbow, Black Sabbath, and of course, his own group, Dio. This best-of, which covers the Dio years exclusively, spans the period 1983's Holy Diver and 1990's Lock Up the Wolves, and is packed with the kind of high-octane performances Dio fans have come to treasure. Neo-Gothic masterpieces like "Sunset Superman" and "Dream Evil" share space with the metal mysticism of "Last in Line," while Dio's hell's-gate scream holds sway over all.

Track listing
"Rainbow in the Dark" (Dio/Appice/Bain/Campbell) - 4:15
"Holy Diver" (Dio) - 5:52
"Night People" (Dio/Goldy/Bain/Schnell/Appice) - 4:08
"The Last in Line" (Dio/Bain/Campbell) - 5:46
"Evil Eyes" (Dio) - 3:40
"Sunset Superman" (Dio/Goldy/Bain/Schnell/Appice) - 5:47
"Dream Evil" (Dio/Goldy) - 4:24
"Hollywood Black" (Dio/G/Appice) - 5:11
"Wild One" (Dio/Robertson) - 4:07
"Evilution" (Dio/G/Pilson/Appice) - 5:36

Personnel

Dio
Ronnie James Dio: vocals (all tracks)
Vivian Campbell: guitar (tracks 1,2,4-6)
Jimmy Bain: bass (tracks 1-6)
Vinny Appice: drums (tracks 1-6,8,10)
Claude Schnell: keyboards (tracks 3-6)
Craig Goldy: guitar (tacks 3,6)
Simon Wright: drums (track 9)
Rowan Robertson: guitar (track 9)
Teddy Cook: bass (track 9)
Jens Johansson: keyboards (track 9)
Tracy G: guitar (tracks 8,10)
Jeff Pilson: bass, keyboards (tracks 8,10)

Production
NNP: Art Direction
Dean Schachtel: Compilation Producer

References

Dio (band) albums
Warner Records albums
2005 compilation albums